Arafoe is a genus of flowering plants belonging to the family Apiaceae.

Its native range is Transcaucasus.

Species:

Arafoe aromatica

References

Apioideae
Apioideae genera